John Mansell (22 August 1927 – 19 March 2016) was a professional football player and coach. He made 274 appearances in the Football League as a defender for Brighton & Hove Albion, Cardiff City and Portsmouth. After retiring as a player, he joined the coaching staff at Sheffield Wednesday. There, in early April 1964, he became interim manager after the sacking of Vic Buckingham. He coached many clubs with his longest spell being at Reading and had experience overseas with the likes of Blauw-Wit Amsterdam, Boston Beacons and the Israel national team. In 1982, Mansell was chosen to train Maccabi Haifa, after a year at the Israeli national team.
Mansell died on 19 March 2016.

References

External links
 Managerial statistics of Jack Mansell on Soccerbase.com 

1927 births
2016 deaths
Footballers from Salford
English footballers
England B international footballers
English Football League players
Brighton & Hove Albion F.C. players
Cardiff City F.C. players
Portsmouth F.C. players
English football managers
English expatriate football managers
English expatriate sportspeople in Bahrain
English expatriate sportspeople in Turkey
English expatriate sportspeople in the Netherlands
English expatriate sportspeople in Israel
English expatriate sportspeople in the United States
Sheffield Wednesday F.C. non-playing staff
Blauw-Wit Amsterdam managers
Rotherham United F.C. managers
Reading F.C. managers
Galatasaray S.K. (football) managers
Bahrain national football team managers
Israel national football team managers
Maccabi Haifa F.C. managers
North American Soccer League (1968–1984) coaches
Expatriate football managers in Bahrain
Expatriate football managers in the Netherlands
Expatriate football managers in Israel
Expatriate football managers in Turkey
Expatriate soccer managers in the United States
SC Telstar managers
English Football League representative players
Association football defenders